St. John's Lutheran Church and Cemetery is a historic Evangelical Lutheran church and cemetery and national historic district near Wytheville, Virginia, United States. The church was built in 1854 and is a rectangular, three bay by two bay, frame church sheathed in weatherboard. It measures 45 feet by 55 feet, has a gable roof, and sits on a limestone basement.  The auditorium has a gallery.  The adjacent cemetery includes a notable group of
approximately 30 early-19th century, German-style monuments.

It was listed on the National Register of Historic Places in 1978.

References

External links
 
 
 

19th-century Lutheran churches in the United States
Churches completed in 1812
Churches in Wythe County, Virginia
Historic districts on the National Register of Historic Places in Virginia
Lutheran churches in Virginia
National Register of Historic Places in Wythe County, Virginia
Churches on the National Register of Historic Places in Virginia
Lutheran cemeteries in the United States